Brad Bell may refer to:

 Brad Bell (golfer) (born 1961), American golfer
 Brad Bell (producer) (born 1985), American television producer and writer